WMQT (107.7 FM) is a hot adult contemporary radio station in Marquette, Michigan owned by the Keweenaw Bay Indian Community.

History
The station went on the air in 1974 on 107.1 FM; the original format until the early 1980s was beautiful music. In 1985, the frequency was changed to 107.5 FM and then in 1995 to 107.7 FM. WMQT has shifted between Hot AC and CHR over the years. The station has used the on-air identifier "Q107" for years (in the 1980s, it was popularly known as "Stereo Rock Q107") and primarily competes with CHR WGLQ (97.1), CHR WUPZ (94.9), hot AC WKQS-FM 101.9 and rock WUPK (94.1) in the central Upper Peninsula market.

Jim Koski is the station's program director and afternoon radio personality. WMQT's studios were located in Ishpeming, Michigan but moved to downtown Marquette. The stations transmitter is located at Morgan Meadows on the outskirts of Marquette and broadcasts with an Effective Radiated Power of 100,000 watts.

References
Michiguide.com - WMQT-FM History

External links

MQT
Radio stations established in 1971